Adam Nicolson,  (born 12 September 1957) is an English author who has written about history, landscape, great literature and the sea. He is also the 5th Baron Carnock, but does not use the title.

He is noted for his books Sea Room (about the Shiant Isles, a group of uninhabited islands in the Hebrides); God's Secretaries: The Making of the King James Bible; The Mighty Dead (US title:Why Homer Matters) exploring the epic Greek poems; The Seabird's Cry about the disaster afflicting the world's seabirds; The Making of Poetry on the Romantic Revolution in England in the 1790s; and Life Between the Tides, a boundary-crossing account of the tides in human and animal life.

Biography
Adam Nicolson is the son of writer Nigel Nicolson and his wife Philippa Tennyson-d'Eyncourt.  He is the grandson of the writers Vita Sackville-West and Sir Harold Nicolson, and great-grandson of Sir Eustace Tennyson d'Eyncourt and Arthur Nicolson, 1st Baron Carnock. He was educated at Eaton House, Summer Fields School, Eton College where he was a King's Scholar, and Magdalene College, Cambridge. He has worked as a journalist and columnist on the Sunday Times, the Sunday Telegraph, the Daily Telegraph, National Geographic Magazine and Granta, where he is a contributing editor. He is a Fellow of the Royal Society of Literature, the Society of Antiquaries and the Society of Antiquaries of Scotland.

He has made several television series (with Keo Films) and radio series (with Tim Dee, the writer and radio producer) on a variety of subjects including the King James Bible, 17th-century literacy, Crete, Homer, the idea of Arcadia, the untold story of Britain's 20th-century whalers and the future of Atlantic seabirds.

Between 2005 and 2009, in partnership with the National Trust, Nicolson led a project which transformed the  surrounding the house and garden at Sissinghurst into a productive mixed farm, growing meat, fruit, cereals and vegetables for the National Trust restaurant. And between 2012 and 2017, together with the RSPB, the EU and SNH, Nicolson and his son Tom were partners in a project to eradicate invasive predators from the Shiant Isles, Outer Hebrides, Scotland. In March 2018, the islands were declared rat-free.

In December 2008 he succeeded his cousin David Nicolson, 4th Baron Carnock, as 5th Baron Carnock but he does not use the title.

Personal life
Nicolson met his first wife, the writer Olivia Fane, when he was a student at Cambridge University. They married in 1982, and had sons Thomas (born 1984); William (born 1986); and Ben (born 1988). They were divorced in 1992 and since then he has been married to the writer and gardener Sarah Raven, with whom he has two daughters: Rosie (born 1993); Molly (born 1996). The family live at Perch Hill Farm  in Sussex.

Awards and recognition

 1986 Somerset Maugham Award Frontiers
 1987 PBFA Topography Prize  (winner) Wetland (with Patrick Sutherland)
 1997 British Press Awards Feature Writer of the Year (shortlist)
 1998 British Book Awards Illustrated Book of the Year (shortlist) Restoration
 2002 Duff Cooper Prize (shortlist) Sea Room
 2004 Royal Society of Literature Heinemann Award  (winner) Power and Glory
 2005 Fellow of the Royal Society of Literature
 2006 Royal United Services Institute Duke of Westminster's Medal for Military Literature (shortlist) Men of Honour
 2009 Royal Society of Literature Ondaatje Prize (winner) Sissinghurst: An Unfinished History
 2009 Samuel Johnson Prize (longlist) Sissinghurst: an Unfinished History
 2010 Fellow of the Society of Antiquaries
 2014 Samuel Johnson Prize (longlist) The Mighty Dead: Why Homer Matters
 2014 Scottish BAFTA (winner, Factual Series) Britain's Whale Hunters
 2015 London Hellenic Prize (shortlist) The Mighty Dead: Why Homer Matters
 2017 Richard Jefferies Society Award for Nature Writing (winner) The Seabird's Cry
 2018 Gomes Lecturer, Emmanuel College, Cambridge
 2018 Wainwright Prize (winner) The Seabird's Cry
 2019 Costa Biography Award (shortlist) The Making of Poetry
 2021 Sunday Times Audible Short Story Award (longlist) The Fearful Summer
 2022 Richard Jefferies Society Award for Nature Writing (shortlist) the sea is not made of water: Life between the Tides
 2022 Wainwright Prize (longlist) the sea is not made of water: Life between the Tides

Books
 The National Trust Book of Long Walks (Weidenfeld 1981)
 Long Walks in France (Weidenfeld 1983)
 Frontiers (Weidenfeld 1985)
 Wetland (Michael Joseph 1987)
 Two Roads to Dodge City (Weidenfeld 1988) with Nigel Nicolson
 Prospects of England (Weidenfeld 1990)
 On Foot: Guided Walks in England, France, and the United States (Weidenfeld/Harmony 1990)
 Restoration: Rebuilding of Windsor Castle (Michael Joseph 1997)
 Regeneration: The Story of the Dome (HarperCollins 1999)
 Perch Hill: A New Life (Constable 2000)
 Mrs Kipling: The Hated Wife (Short Books 2001)
 Sea Room (HarperCollins 2001/US edition Farrar, Straus and Giroux 2002)
 Power and Glory: The Making of the King James Bible (US title: God's Secretaries) (HarperCollins 2003) (2011 reissued in UK as When God Spoke English)
 Seamanship (HarperCollins 2004)
 Men of Honour: Trafalgar and the Making of the English Hero (US title: Seize the Fire: Heroism, Duty, and the Battle of Trafalgar) (HarperCollins 2005)
 Earls of Paradise (US title: Quarrel with the King) (HarperCollins 2008)
 Sissinghurst: An Unfinished History (HarperCollins 2008/US revised edition Viking 2010)
 Arcadia: The Dream of Perfection in Renaissance England (a revised paperback edition of Earls of Paradise) (HarperCollins 2009)
 The Smell of Summer Grass (an updated edition of Perch Hill) (HarperCollins 2011)
 The Gentry: Stories of the English (HarperCollins 2011)
 The Mighty Dead: Why Homer Matters (US title Henry Holt: Why Homer Matters) (HarperCollins 2014)
 The Seabird's Cry: The Life and Loves of Puffins, Gannets and Other Ocean Voyagers (HarperCollins 2017) (US Henry Holt: The Lives and Loves of the Planet's Great Ocean Voyagers (2018))
 The Making of Poetry: Coleridge, the Wordsworths and their Year of Marvels (HarperCollins 2019/US edition Farrar, Straus and Giroux 2020)
 The sea is not made of water: Life between the Tides (HarperCollins 2021/US edition Farrar, Straus and Giroux Life between the Tides 2022)

Television

 Atlantic Britain  Channel 4, 2004
 Sissinghurst  BBC 4, 2009
 When God Spoke English: The Making of the King James Bible  BBC 4, 2011
 The Century That Wrote Itself  BBC 4, 2013
 Britain's Whale Hunters  BBC 4, 2014
 The Last Seabird Summer?  BBC 4, 2016

Radio

 Homer's Landscapes 3 x 45 mins, BBC Radio 3, 2008
 A Cretan Spring 5 x 15 mins, with Sarah Raven, BBC Radio 3, 2009
 Dark Arcadias 2 x 45 mins, BBC Radio 3, 2011

References

External links
 Author page at Harper Collins

1957 births
Living people
British people of Scottish descent
British people of Irish descent
British people of Spanish descent
5
Fellows of the Society of Antiquaries of London
Fellows of the Royal Society of Literature
People educated at Eton College
Alumni of Magdalene College, Cambridge
People educated at Summer Fields School
British columnists
British television presenters
British male writers
Fellows of the Society of Antiquaries of Scotland
Male non-fiction writers
Adam